James Godwyn (c. 1557 – 1616), of Wells, Somerset, was an English politician.

He was a Member (MP) of the Parliament of England for Wells in 1593. He was Mayor of Wells in 1593–94 and 1613–14.

References

1550s births
1616 deaths
Mayors of Wells, Somerset
English MPs 1593